Brian Adams is an American basketball coach who serves as a Player Development coach for the Philadelphia 76ers of the National Basketball Association (NBA). He grew up in the state of New York.

Coaching career

College Coaching Career
Brian Adams  was hired as coach for Harvard University and Marist College

Agua Caliente Clippers
On August 1, 2018, Adams was named the head coach after previously serving as a player development coach with the LA Clippers.

Philadelphia 76ers
On November 9, 2020, the Philadelphia 76ers hired Adams as a player development coach under Doc Rivers.

References

Living people
American men's basketball coaches
Harvard Crimson men's basketball coaches
Marist Red Foxes men's basketball coaches
Philadelphia 76ers assistant coaches
Year of birth missing (living people)